EDA Youth ('Neolaia EDA', abbreviated NEDA) was the youth wing of the Greek United Democratic Left (EDA). NEDA was a member of the World Federation of Democratic Youth (WFDY).

NEDA merged with the Grigoris Lambrakis Democratic Youth Movement in September 1964, forming the Lambrakis Democratic Youth (DNL).

References

Youth wings of political parties in Greece
History of Greece (1949–1974)
United Democratic Left